"Changes" is a song by Black Sabbath. It first appeared on Vol. 4, which was released in 1972. Pitchfork author Stephen Deusner labeled it as one of Black Sabbath's best songs.

Overview
The song's piano melody was composed by guitarist Tony Iommi, who was experimenting with the instrument in the studio. The lyrics were by bassist Geezer Butler, and vocalist Ozzy Osbourne has referred to the song as "heartbreaking". Quite different from Sabbath's previous work, the song was described as a "forlornly pretty" ballad by critic Barney Hoskyns. It was inspired mainly by drummer Bill Ward's breakup with his first wife.

Notably, "Changes" was not recorded with a real string ensemble. Instead, Geezer Butler and Tony Iommi used a Mellotron to create the sound of an orchestra. The ballad is generally an outlier in the band’s discography as it does not feature guitar or drums. To alleviate concerns about the band departing their well-known heavy sound, Osbourne promised in a 1972 interview "We're certainly not going to get any less heavy, we will probably do 'Changes' on stage with a Mellotron, but we'll never take strings on stage with us or anything like that."

The band first performed the song live in 1973.

"Changes" was ranked the 12th best Black Sabbath song by Rock - Das Gesamtwerk der größten Rock-Acts im Check.

Personnel (original version)
 Ozzy Osbournevocals
 Tony Iommipiano, mellotron
 Geezer Butlerbass guitar, mellotron

Ozzy and Kelly Osbourne version

Three decades later, Ozzy recorded another version of the song, this time with his daughter, Kelly Osbourne as a duet. The revised lyrics for this version, released on 8 December 2003, reflect the moments of their life together. The single reached number one on the UK Singles Chart, becoming the second father-daughter duet to top the chart after Frank and Nancy Sinatra did so with "Somethin' Stupid" in 1967. "Changes" also reached the top 20 in Germany, Ireland, and Norway.

According to the Ozzy Osbourne official website, the single sold over one million copies. This version of the song was ranked number 27 on the "50 Worst Songs of the '00s" list in a 2009 Village Voice article.

Track listings
 UK CD1
 "Changes" – 4:07
 "Changes" (Felix da Housecat's dance mix) – 6:11
 "Come Dig Me Out" (live) – 3:54

 UK CD2
 "Changes" – 4:07
 "Changes" (Who's the Daddy dub mix) – 5:41
 "Changes" (enhanced video) – 4:07

Charts

Weekly charts

Year-end charts

Certifications

Release history

Charles Bradley version
Charles Bradley recorded a cover of the song in a soul music style. It was first released as a Record Store Day Black Friday single in 2013, and would later be released as the title track of Bradley's 2016 album Changes.

The following year, Bradley's cover received increased exposure when it was used as the theme song to the Netflix-produced adult animated sitcom Big Mouth. The series' cast members Maya Rudolph and Jordan Peele also performed a version of the song for the series' soundtrack in character as Connie the Hormone Monstress and the Ghost of Duke Ellington, respectively.

Charles Bradley's version of the song is featured in the 5th episode of the 4th season of the show Black-ish.

Bradley's version of the song also appeared in an episode of the HBO series Big Little Lies, and was featured on the soundtrack album of the show's second season.

This version saw further use in an April 2022 promo for Turner Classic Movies.

In popular culture
Eminem sampled "Changes" on "Going Through Changes", a track on his 2010 album Recovery.

References

1972 songs
2003 singles
2013 singles
British soft rock songs
Sanctuary Records singles
Songs written by Ozzy Osbourne
Songs written by Tony Iommi
Songs written by Geezer Butler
Songs written by Bill Ward (musician)
Black Sabbath songs
Ozzy Osbourne songs
Kelly Osbourne songs
Number-one singles in Scotland
UK Independent Singles Chart number-one singles
UK Singles Chart number-one singles
Rock ballads
Male–female vocal duets
1970s ballads